The Cormorant oilfield is located  north east of Lerwick, Shetland, Scotland, in block number 211/26a. The discovery well, 211/26-1 was drilled by semi submersible rig Staflo.

Ownership
Originally, it was operated by Shell and licensed to Shell/Esso.  On 7 July 2008, it was purchased by Abu Dhabi National Energy Company.

Production
Production started in December 1979 from the Cormorant Alpha platform. This platform is a concrete gravity platform of the Sea Tank Co type. The total sub-structure weight is 294,655 tonnes and it is designed to carry a topsides weight of 32,350 tonnes.

The topsides facilities included capability to drill, produce, meter and pump oil. It also has capability to re-inject water to maintain reservoir pressure. The platform is also the starting point for the Brent System pipeline, a major communications centre and the location of Brent Log - air traffic control for Northern North Sea helicopter traffic.

The topsides for Cormorant Alpha were designed by Matthew Hall Engineering which was awarded the contract in October 1974. Initially there were facilities for 17 oil production wells, 18 water injection wells and one gas injection well. The production capacity was 60,000 barrels of oil per day and 900,000 standard cubic metres of gas per day. There was a single production train of three stages of separation with the first stage operating at a pressure of 30 barg. The 16 subsea storage cells had a capacity of 600,000 barrels. Electricity generation was powered by one 12 MW Rolls-Royce Avon gas turbine and four 2.5 MW Solar Mars gas turbines. The topside accommodation was for 200 people. There are 16 topsides modules and the topsides weight was 25,000 tonnes. Details of the construction are given in the table.

In addition an Underwater Manifold Centre (controlled from the Cormorant platform also produces oil. This started up in mid 1983. The UMC lost communications several years ago but a project ongoing in 2006 is looking to produce from the UMC once again.

Natural gas is exported from Cormorant Alpha via the Vesterled gas pipeline which connect into the FLAGS pipeline at Brent Alpha to St Fergus Gas Terminal.

Accidents
A Norwegian organisation states that the Cormorant A platform almost sank in 1977 during its construction in Norway. This was disputed in a TV documentary on 7 May 2007.

Reported by IPA as occurring 3 March 1983, Cormorant Alpha Platform,. There were 3 in total killed in this explosion and following fire. 2 killed outright (blown against a set of Scaffolding  opposite the door on the production deck they entered the module by) Another died of Burns a week or so later in hospital. The Treasure Finder (shuttle Accommodation, hospital and 2 helli-decks), was parked midway between Cormorant Alpha and the Cormorant North, then lifted anchor and steamed over ready for evacuation, standing off about 500 yards.

The Cormorant Alpha crew waited inside the safe accommodation area for 2–3 days  while the weather remained too bad for general helicopter evacuations, and eventually stood down and back to work a week or so later.

On 16 January 2013 and again on 2 March 2013 a hydrocarbon leak in one of the legs of the platform was reported. Personnel were evacuated from the platform and the Brent System was closed down, however no oil had been spilt into the sea.  Many environmental groups called for the UK and Scottish governments to regulate the industry and the "aging" platforms more closely.

See also
Energy policy of the United Kingdom
Energy use and conservation in the United Kingdom

References

North Sea oil fields
Oil and gas industry in Shetland
Oil fields of Scotland